The Human Comedy may refer to:
 The Human Comedy, or La Comédie humaine, an 1829–1848 collection of interrelated novels and stories by Honoré de Balzac
 The Human Comedy (novel), a 1943 novel
 The Human Comedy (film), a 1943 film
 The Human Comedy (musical), a 1983 musical

See also
La Comédie humaine (film), a 2010 Hong Kong film
Lost Illusions (2021 film), whose working title was Comédie humaine